Kanzeh Rud (also Romanized as Kanzeh Rūd; also known as Ganzerūd, Ganz Rūd, Kanz Rūd, and Kyanzary) is a village in Minjavan-e Gharbi Rural District, Minjavan District, Khoda Afarin County, East Azerbaijan Province, Iran. At the 2006 census, its population was 142, in 25 families.

References 

Populated places in Khoda Afarin County